Cradle Song is a 1960 American TV film for the Hallmark Hall of Fame directed by George Schaefer.

Plot
An infant is reared by nuns in a convent.

Cast
Maurice Evans
Judith Anderson
Siobhán McKenna

Production
Helen Hayes was going to star but had to pull out when her husband fell ill.

Reception
The New York Times called it "superb".

1960 Production
The play was filmed again in 1960 with the same director and many of the same cast.

Cast
Judith Anderson as The Prioress
Evelyn Varden as The Vicaress
Siobhán McKenna as Sister Joanna of the Cross
Barry Jones as The Doctor
Anthony Franciosa as Antonio

References

External links
1956 production at BFI

1960 television films
1960 films
Films directed by George Schaefer
Hallmark Hall of Fame episodes